Souppes–Château-Landon is a railway station in Souppes-sur-Loing, Île-de-France, France. The station is located on the Moret–Lyon railway. The station is served by Transilien line R (from Paris-Gare de Lyon to Montargis) operated by SNCF.

See also
Transilien Paris–Lyon

References

External links

 

Railway stations in Seine-et-Marne
Railway stations in France opened in 1860